

Bristensee is a lake in the Canton of Uri, Switzerland. It is located below the mountain Bristen and above the village of Bristen.

There is a lodge for tourists and campers located directly opposite the lake.

References

Lakes of Switzerland
Lakes of the canton of Uri